Autrécourt-sur-Aire (literally "Autrécourt on Aire") is a commune in the Meuse department in the Grand Est region in northeastern France.

Autrécourt-sur-Aire is the only village in this commune. The nearest town is Verdun, 27.4 km to the northeast.

Population

Gallery

See also
Communes of the Meuse department

References

External links

Communes of Meuse (department)